Maria Chlaui Denise T. Malayao (born January 24, 2008) is a Filipino actress known for her roles on Yagit and Little Nanay.

Personal life
Maria Chlaui Denise Malayao was born to a family of 5 in Imus, Cavite she has 2 older siblings and 2 younger sibling with the latter being the third oldest.

Career 
Malayao foray a television advert of Lucky Me instant noodles, and Neozep.

Filmography

Television

Film

References
 Chlaui Malayao, naipaayos na ang bahay dahil sa ‘Yagit’. Retrieved 2017-06-29
 ‘Yagit’ for Millennials. Retrieved 2017-06-29

External links
 

2008 births
Living people
Filipino television actresses
Filipino child actresses
GMA Network personalities
Filipino people of Spanish descent